Isa Miranda (born Ines Isabella Sampietro; 5 July 1909 – 8 July 1982) was an Italian actress with an international film career.

Biography
Miranda was born Ines Isabella Sampietro in Milan, the daughter of atreet car conductor in Mian. When she was 10 years old, she began working as an errand girl for a dressmaker. She later had jobs in a box factory and a handbag factory. When she was 15, she was a model, a job that provided enough income for her to learn bookkeeping and typing in night school.  She worked as a typist while attending the Accademia dei Filodrammatici in Milan and training as a stage actress. She went on to play bit parts in Italian films in Rome. She changed her name to Isa Miranda and success came with Max Ophüls' film La Signora di tutti (Everybody's Woman; 1934) in which she played Gaby Doriot, a famous film star and adventuress with whom men cannot help falling in love. This performance brought in its wake several film offers and a Hollywood contract with Paramount Pictures. There, billed as the "Italian Marlene Dietrich", she played femme fatale roles in films such as Hotel Imperial (1939) and Adventure in Diamonds (1940). 

She returned to Italy soon after the outbreak of World War II and continued to act on stage and to make films. In 1949, she starred in René Clément's The Walls of Malapaga, which won an Academy Award for the most outstanding foreign language film of 1950, and for Miranda, the Palme d'Or at the Cannes Film Festival. Another success of that period was La Ronde (1950), also directed by Ophüls.

Her career took her to France, Germany and Britain, where she frequently appeared in TV films, including The Avengers. Other notable film appearances included Siamo donne (1953), a portmanteau film, in which Miranda shared the screen with Anna Magnani, Alida Valli and Ingrid Bergman; Summertime (1955), starring Katharine Hepburn; Gli Sbandati (1955); The Yellow Rolls-Royce (1964); The Shoes of the Fisherman (1968); and Liliana Cavani's 
The Night Porter (1974).

Miranda was married to the Italian director and producer Alfredo Guarini until his death in 1981. She died in Rome on 8 July 1982.

Selected filmography

 The Haller Case (1933) - Badwoman
 Cardinal Lambertini (1934) - Anna
 Everybody's Woman (1934) - Gabriella Murge, alias Gaby Doriot
 Tenebre (1934) - Vera
 Creatures of the Night (1934) - Una gigolette
 Red Passport (1935) - Maria Brunetti
 Like the Leaves (1935) - Irene "Nennele" Rosani
 The Love of the Maharaja (1936) - Mira Salviati
 A Woman Between Two Worlds (1936) - Mina Salviati
 Thou Art My Joy (1936) - Mary Hofer & Bianca Monti
 The Man from Nowhere (1937) - Louise Paléari
 The Former Mattia Pascal (1937) - Luisa Paleari
 Scipio Africanus: The Defeat of Hannibal (1937) - Velia, a Roman woman
 The Lie of Nina Petrovna (1937) - Nina Petrovna
 Like the Leaves (1938) - Nennele
 Hotel Imperial (1939) - Anna Warschawska
 Adventure in Diamonds (1940) - Felice Falcon
 Senza cielo (1940) - Regina
 A Woman Has Fallen (1941) - Dina
 Document Z-3 (1942) - Sandra Morini
 Malombra (1942) - Marina di Malombra
 Zazà (1944) - Zazà
 La carne e l'anima (1945) - Katrin detta "Stella"
 My Widow and I (1945) - Maria, sua moglie
 L'aventure commence demain (1948) - Clarence Holbane
 The Walls of Malapaga (1949) - Marta Manfredini
 I'm in the Revue (1950) - Isa
 Pact with the Devil (1950) - Marta Larocca
 La Ronde (1950) - Charlotte, the Actress
 Cameriera bella presenza offresi... (1951) - Angela Leonardi
 The Seven Deadly Sins (1952) - Mme Alvaro (segment "Avarice et la colère, L' / Avarice and Anger")
 Gli uomini non guardano il cielo (1952) - The countess
 We, the Women (1953) - Isa (segment "Isa Miranda")
 Before the Deluge (1954) - Madame Françoise Boussard
 The Secret of Helene Marimon (1954) - Hélène Marimon
 Rasputin (1954) - La tsarine Alexandra
 Summertime (1955) - Signora Fiorini
 The Abandoned (1955) - Contessa Luisa
 Rommel's Treasure (1955) - Mrs. Fischer
 I pinguini ci guardano (1956)
 I colpevoli (1957) - Lucia Rossello
 Arrivano i dollari! (1957) - Caterina Marchetti
A Kiss for a Killer (1957) - Betty Farnwell
 Le secret du Chevalier d'Éon (1959) - La tzarine Elisabeth Petrovna
 Corruption (1963) - Signora Mattoli
 The Empty Canvas (1963) - Cecilia's Mother
 Hardi Pardaillan! (1964) - Catherine de Medicis
 Dog Eat Dog (1964) - Madame Benoit
 Do You Know This Voice? (1964) - Mrs. Marotta
 The Yellow Rolls-Royce (1964) - Duchesse d'Angouleme
 Una storia di notte (1964) - Peppino's wife
 Un monde nouveau (1966) - Une sage-femme
 Hell Is Empty (1967) - Isa Grant
 Darling Caroline (1968) - La duchesse de Bussez
 The Shoes of the Fisherman (1968) - The Marchesa
 L'assoluto naturale (1969) - Mother
 La donna a una dimensione (1969) - Elena
 The Syndicate: A Death in the Family (1970) - Tenutaria bordello
 Dorian Gray (1970) - Mrs. Ruxton
 Roy Colt and Winchester Jack (1970) - Mammola / Violet
 Un estate con sentimento (1970) - Sue's Mother
 Marta (1971) - Elena
 A Bay of Blood (1971) - Countess Federica Donati
 Lo chiameremo Andrea (1972) - Teacher
 The Night Porter (1974) - Countess Stein
 Le farò da padre (1974) - Lorè
 La lunga strada senza polvere (1977) - The wife
 Apocalisse di un terremoto (1982) - Madre di Ciro (final film role)

References

External links

 
 Photographs and literature

1909 births
1982 deaths
20th-century Italian actresses
Actors from Bergamo
Italian film actresses
Italian stage actresses
Cannes Film Festival Award for Best Actress winners
Burials at the Cimitero Flaminio